Christina Tobin (born June 17, 1981) is an American activist and leader in the election reform and voters' rights movements. She is the founder and chair of The Free & Equal Elections Foundation, and president and chief executive officer of Free and Equal, Inc.

Background
Tobin was born in Pasadena, Texas, in 1981. She grew up in Texas and Illinois and graduated from Fenwick High School in Oak Park, Illinois. She attended Saint Mary's University in Winona, Minnesota where she served as varsity tennis captain and volunteered for Habitat for Humanity. In 2004, she earned a bachelor's degree in graphic design with a minor in business marketing.

Career and activism
Tobin started her career as a non-partisan ballot access coordinator. An expert in defending signatures and coordinating petition drives, Tobin has helped gather and defend over one million signatures for independents, the Green Party, the Constitution Party, the Republican Party, the Democratic Party, the Libertarian Party and the Socialist Equality Party.

Illinois campaigns
In the 1998 election for governor of Illinois, Tobin helped defend over 60,000 signatures for her father, Libertarian candidate James Tobin. In 2002, she personally gathered over 5,000 signatures and successfully defended 55,000 signatures for Cal Skinner, who was running for governor, and her father, who was running for lieutenant governor representing the Libertarian Party.

In the 2004 presidential election, Tobin defended 29,000 signatures in Illinois for Ralph Nader when he ran as an independent. She also sued Democratic State Chair Michael Madigan alleging that he used his full-time state employees to have Nader removed from the Illinois ballot.

For the November 2006 election, she successfully defended 39,000 signatures for Rich Whitney, the Green Party candidate for Illinois governor.

Ralph Nader's 2008 presidential campaign
In 2008, Tobin served as Ralph Nader's national ballot access coordinator. She helped collect more than 500,000 signatures to put Ralph Nader on the District of Columbia ballot and 45 state presidential ballots, more than any other third party or independent candidate. While coordinating the national ballot drive in 50 states, Tobin organized a successful petition drive in Illinois, Pennsylvania, Connecticut and New York.

BaliJewel Inc. lawsuit
In 2008, Tobin filed a lawsuit against John Hardy Limited, alleging harassment of jewelry designers in Bali and improper copyrighting of a Balinese folk motif.

Free & Equal Elections Foundation

In 2008, Tobin founded the Free & Equal Elections Foundation, a 501(c)(3) non-profit, non-partisan grassroots organization, whose mission is to empower American voters through education.

Free and Equal, Inc.
In March 2009, Tobin founded Free and Equal, Inc., a non-partisan, full-service ballot access consulting and petitioning firm that specializes in independent and third-party candidates. Tobin has helped gather and defend over one million signatures for independents, the Green Party, the Constitution Party, the Republican Party, the Democratic Party, the Libertarian Party and the Socialist Equality Party. Free and Equal, Inc. does not endorse any candidates for office. She serves as president and chief executive officer.

Taxpayers United of America
In 2011, Tobin served as Vice President of Taxpayers United of America, founded by her father James Tobin. Her work exposed big pension payouts in Illinois and other states.

Activism to Stop the Top Two Primary System
Tobin is a passionate activist against the top two primary systems. In 2012, she founded Stop Top Two, a movement designed to educate voters of the machinations behind the relatively new electoral trend. Louisiana, Washington and California elections are now controlled via top two primary systems. Arizona's version of a top two primary system, Proposition 121, was defeated by Arizona voters November 2012. The main objective of Tobin's Stop Top Two movement was to defeat the proposition through education, media outreach and panel discussions, including the "Problems with Arizona's Top Two Primary System – Proposition 121" panel presented by the Free & Equal Elections Foundation at the Goldwater Institute on October 9, 2012.

Debates
Free & Equal hosts open, all-inclusive gubernatorial, Presidential and senatorial debates, including the 2008, 2012, and 2016 Presidential debates moderated by Pulitzer Prize winning journalist Chris Hedges, broadcast legend Larry King, Thom Hartmann of Free Speech TV, and Emmy Award winning actor Ed Asner.

California Secretary of State candidacy
Tobin ran as the Libertarian Party candidate for the California Secretary of State election, 2010. She formally announced her candidacy for Secretary of State on February 23, 2010. She was the only candidate seeking the Libertarian Party nomination. Richard Winger, editor and publisher of Ballot Access News was her campaign manager.

In the general election, Tobin came in fourth with 214,347 votes, 2.3 percent of the total votes cast.

References

External links
 Christina Tobin for CA Secretary of State
 The Free and Equal Elections Foundation
 Free and Equal Inc.

1981 births
Living people
21st-century American politicians
21st-century American women politicians
Activists from California
California Independents
California Libertarians
People from Pasadena, Texas
Saint Mary's University of Minnesota alumni
Women in California politics